Charles Hardy Carr (August 18, 1903 – March 13, 1976) was a United States district judge of the United States District Court for the Southern District of California and the United States District Court for the Central District of California.

Education and career

Born in Coahoma, Mississippi, Carr received an Artium Baccalaureus degree from Vanderbilt University in 1925 and a Bachelor of Laws from Yale Law School in 1926. He was in private practice in Memphis, Tennessee from 1926 to 1929. He was an instructor at Southwestern University in Los Angeles, California from 1930 to 1931, thereafter returning to private practice in Los Angeles from 1931 to 1933. He was an Assistant United States Attorney in the Southern District of California from 1933 to 1936, and then a special assistant to the United States Attorney General until 1940. He was again in private practice in Los Angeles from 1940 to 1943. He was the United States Attorney for the Southern District of California from 1943 to 1946. He was in private practice in Los Angeles from 1946 to 1962.

Federal judicial service

Carr was nominated by President John F. Kennedy on July 12, 1962, to the United States District Court for the Southern District of California, to a new seat authorized by 75 Stat. 80. He was confirmed by the United States Senate on August 9, 1962, and received his commission on August 14, 1962. He was reassigned by operation of law on September 18, 1966, to the United States District Court for the Central District of California, to a new seat authorized by 80 Stat. 75. He assumed senior status on August 18, 1973. His service terminated on March 13, 1976, due to his death.

References

Sources
 

1903 births
1976 deaths
People from Coahoma, Mississippi
Vanderbilt University alumni
Yale Law School alumni
United States Attorneys for the Southern District of California
Judges of the United States District Court for the Southern District of California
Judges of the United States District Court for the Central District of California
United States district court judges appointed by John F. Kennedy
20th-century American judges
20th-century American lawyers
Assistant United States Attorneys